Simon von Geldern (1720–1774) was a German traveler and author.

He was the great-uncle of Heinrich Heine, who describes him in his "Memoirs" as an adventurer and Utopian dreamer. The cognomen "Oriental" was given him because of his long journeys in Oriental countries. He spent many years in the maritime cities in the north of Africa and in the Moroccan states, there learning the trade of armorer, which he carried on with success.

Von Geldern made a pilgrimage to Jerusalem, and during an ecstasy of prayer, while upon Mount Moriah, he had a vision. Subsequently he was chosen by an independent tribe of Bedouins on one of the oases of the North-African desert as their leader or sheikh, and thus became the captain of a band of marauders. He next visited the European courts, and subsequently took refuge in England to escape the consequences of the discovery of his too gallant relations with a lady of high birth. He pretended to have a secret knowledge of the Cabala, and issued a pamphlet in French verse entitled "Moïse sur Mont Horeb", probably having reference to the above-mentioned vision.

See also 
 Heine, Geldern
 Gustav Heine von Geldern
 Robert von Heine-Geldern

Bibliography (of Jewish Encyclopedia) 
 Memoirs of Heinrich Heine, ed. Evans, pp. 167–172 ;
 Kaufmann, David, Aus Heinrich Heine's Ahnensaal, 1896 ;

1720 births
1774 deaths
18th-century German writers
18th-century German male writers